Punk Rock New York is an album by punk band Reagan Youth. It was released after the break-up of the band in 1989 and the suicide of lead singer Dave Rubinstein in 1993.  The album is a re-packaging of A Collection of Pop Classics, which compiles the two Reagan Youth studio albums onto a single CD, though it does not include the song "Degenerated".

Track listing
	"Reagan Youth"	-	1:15
	"(Down With the) New Aryans"	-	1:17
	"(Are You) Happy?"	-	1:33
	"No Class"	-	1:34
	"I Hate Hate"	-	1:58
	"Go Nowhere"	-	1:22
	"USA"	-	1:22
	"Anytown"	-	2:00
	"In Dog We Trust"	-	2:50
	"It's A Beautiful Day"	-	3:53
	"Jesus Was A Pacifist"	-	1:44
	"Urban Savages"	-	1:23
	"What Will The Neighbors Think?"	-	3:50
	"Get The Ruler Out"	-	2:25
	"Brave New World"	-	4:30
	"Miss Teen America"	-	2:46
	"Heavy Metal Shuffle"	-	4:38
	"Queen Babylon"	-	5:12
	"Acid Rain"	-	1:55
	"One Holy Bible"	-	6:12
	"Back To The Garden (parts 1-1V)"	-	4:05

Reagan Youth albums
2007 albums